Thomas William Saymoir Meyer (28 February 1928 – 6 November 2017) was a South African film producer.

Producing career
His first movie as producer was released on 18 June 1969. He produced 33 movies between 1969 and 1994. He joined a company belonging to Jamie Uys, but they split up after a few years. He formed his own company Tommie Meyer Films (Pty) Ltd.
His productions are shown below.

Springbok (1976)

In 1977, the University of Pretoria tried to stop the release of this film, due to the fact that it portrayed a coloured person as a student at the institution. The case was brought to trial in Universiteit van Pretoria v Tommie Meyer Films 1977 (4) SA 376, where Meyer won (and again on appeal).

Ipi Tombi (1994)

This movie was an adaptation of the musical Ipi Tombi, by South African writers Bertha Egnos and Gail Lakier. Meyer bought the movie rights from Egnos and Brian Brooke. Meyer had financial problems with this movie and the new investors decided to cast actor Jan-Michael Vincent.

Personal life

Meyer grew up in Boksburg, the son of Petrus Frederik and Catharina Magaritha Meyer. He attended Hoërskool Voortrekker, of which three other South African movie producers, Jamie Uys, Jans Rautenbach and Jan Scoltz, were also pupils. He was married to Emmarentia Truter (whom he later divorced) and they had 6 children. Before producing movies, he acted in the film “Doodkry is min” (translated: "Death is no big deal"), produced by Jamie Uys and released on 22 May 1961. His son, Pietie, played the lead character in his film Pikkie, assisted with the sound in Birds of Paradise, and was the assistant producer for Ipi Tombi. Meyer retired in 1994 and died in 2017.

References

South African film producers
1928 births
2017 deaths